Frederick Christ Trump Sr. (October 11, 1905 – June 25, 1999) was an American real estate developer and businessman. A member of the Trump family, he was the father of Donald Trump, the 45th president of the United States.

In partnership with his mother, Elizabeth Christ Trump, Fred began a career in home construction and sales. Their real estate development company was incorporated as E. Trump & Son in 1927 (later called the Fred Trump Organization). It grew to build and manage single-family houses in Queens, barracks and garden apartments for U.S. Navy personnel near major shipyards along the East Coast, and more than 27,000 apartments in New York City.
Trump was investigated by a U.S. Senate committee for profiteering in 1954, and again by the State of New York in 1966. Donald became the president of his father's real estate business in 1971, and they were sued by the U.S. Justice Department's Civil Rights Division for violating the Fair Housing Act in 1973; in the case settlement, the Trumps were ordered to take several measures to curb racial discrimination.

For decades following World War II, Trump concealed his German ancestry (instead claiming Swedish heritage) to avoid associations with Nazism in light of the Holocaust. He also supported Jewish causes. During Donald Trump's 2016 presidential campaign, reports of Fred Trump's arrest at a 1927 Ku Klux Klan parade resurfaced, although there is no direct evidence that he supported the organization. As president, Donald repeatedly and falsely claimed that his father was born in Germany.

In 2018, an exposé by The New York Times revealed that Trump and his wife, Mary Anne MacLeod Trump, provided over $1 billion (in 2018 currency) to their progeny overall, while effectively evading over $500 million in gift taxes. Trump illicitly contributed several million dollars to Donald between 1987 and 1991, and shortly before his death (while suffering from Alzheimer's disease), transferred the bulk of his apartment buildings to his surviving children; several years later, they sold these for over 16 times their previously declared worth.

Early life and career

Trump's father, the German American Frederick Trump (also known as Friedrich) amassed considerable wealth during the Klondike Gold Rush by running a restaurant for the miners. Friedrich returned to Kallstadt in 1901, and by the next year, met and married Elizabeth Christ. They moved to New York City, where their first child, Elizabeth, was born in 1904. Later that year, the family returned to Kallstadt. Fred was conceived in Bavaria, where his parents wished to  residency, but Friedrich was banished for dodging the draft. The family returned to New York on July 1, 1905, and moved to the Bronx, where Frederick Christ Trump was born on October 11. Fred Trump's younger brother, John G. Trump, was born in 1907. All three children were raised speaking German. In September 1908, the family moved to Woodhaven, Queens. 

Many details of Trump's childhood come from autobiographical accounts and emphasize independence, learning and, above all, hard workeven to the point of being somewhat fictionalized. At the age of 10, Trump worked as a delivery boy for a butcher. About two years later, his father died in the 1918 flu pandemic. From 1918 to 1923, Fred attended Richmond Hill High School in Queens, while working as a caddy, curb whitewasher, delivery boy, and newspaper hawker. Meanwhile, his mother continued the real estate business Frederick had begun. Interested in becoming a builder, Fred put up a garage for a neighbor and took night classes in carpentry and reading blueprints. He also studied plumbing, masonry, and electrical wiring via correspondence courses.   

After graduating in January 1923, Trump obtained full-time work pulling lumber to construction sites. He continued his carpentry education and went on to be a carpenter's assistant. Trump's mother loaned him $800 to build his first house, which he completed and sold in 1924. By 1926, Trump had built 20 homes in Queens, selling some before they were finished to finance others. Elizabeth Trump held the business in her name because Fred had not reached the age of majority. The name "E. Trump & Son" appeared in advertising by 1924. The company was incorporated in 1927.

1927 arrest

On Memorial Day in 1927, over a thousand Ku Klux Klan (KKK) members marched in a Queens parade to protest "Native-born Protestant Americans" being "assaulted by Roman Catholic police of New York City". The 21-year old Trump and six other men were arrested. All seven were referred to as "berobed marchers" in the Long Island Daily Press. Trump, detained "on a charge of refusing to disperse from a parade when ordered to do so", was dismissed. Among the men arrested on the same charge was a bystander who had had his foot run over by a police car. According to the police, the five remaining men were certainly Klan members. Multiple newspaper articles on the incident list Trump's address (in Jamaica, Queens), which he is recorded as living at on various documents from 1928 to 1940. Despite this arrest, there is no evidence that Trump was a member or supporter of the KKK.

Rise to success
In 1933 Trump built one of New York City's first modern supermarkets, called Trump Market, in Woodhaven, Queens. It was modeled on Long Island's King Kullen, a self-service supermarket chain. Trump's store advertised "Serve Yourself and Save!" and quickly became popular. After six months, Trump sold it to King Kullen.

In 1934, Trump and a partner acquired in federal court the mortgage-servicing subsidiary of Brooklyn's J. Lehrenkrauss Corporation, which had gone bankrupt and subsequently been broken up. This gave Trump access to the titles of many properties nearing foreclosure, which he bought at low cost and sold at a profit. This and similar real estate ventures quickly thrust him into the limelight as one of New York City's most successful businessmen.

Trump made use of loan subsidies created by the Federal Housing Administration (FHA) not long after the program was initiated by President Franklin D. Roosevelt in 1934. By 1936, Trump had 400 workers digging foundations for houses that would be sold at prices ranging from $3,000 to $6,250. Trump used his father's tactic of listing properties at prices like $3,999.99. In the late 1930s, he used a yacht called the Trump Show Boat to advertise his business off the shore of Coney Island. It played patriotic music and floated out swordfish-shaped balloons which could be redeemed for $25 or $250 towards one of his properties. In 1938, the Brooklyn Daily Eagle referred to Trump as the "Henry Ford of the home building industry".

Later career

During World War II, Trump built barracks and garden apartments for U.S. Navy personnel near major shipyards along the East Coast. After the war, he expanded into middle-income housing for the families of returning veterans. From 1947 to 1949, Trump built Shore Haven in Bensonhurst, Brooklyn, which included 32 six-story buildings and a shopping center, covering some 30 acres, and procuring him $9 million in FHA funding. In 1950, he built the 23-building Beach Haven Apartments over 40 acres near Coney Island, procuring him $16 million in FHA funds. The total number of apartments included in these projects exceeded 2,700.

In 1961, Trump donated $2,500 to the re-election campaign of New York mayor Robert F. Wagner Jr., helping him gain favor for the construction of Trump Village, a large apartment complex in Coney Island. The project was constructed in 1963–64 for $70 million. It was one of Trump's biggest and last major projects, and the only one to bear his name. He built more than 27,000 low-income apartments and row houses in the New York area altogether. In the 1970s, Trump acquired up to 20% of Brooklyn's Starrett City, a large, federally subsidized housing complex which declared that 70% of its tenants would be white.

Profiteering investigations
In early 1954, President Dwight D. Eisenhower and other federal leaders began denouncing real estate profiteers. On June 11, The New York Times included Trump on a list of 35 city builders accused of profiteering from government contracts. He and others were investigated by a U.S. Senate banking committee for windfall gains. Trump and his partner William Tomasello were cited as examples of how profits were made by builders using the FHA. The two paid $34,200 for a piece of land which they rented to their corporation for $76,960 annually in a 99-year lease, so that if the apartment they built on it ever defaulted, the FHA would owe them $1.924 million. Trump and Tomasello evidently obtained loans for $3.5 million more than Beach Haven Apartments had cost. Trump argued that because he had not withdrawn the money, he had not literally pocketed the profits. He further argued that due to rising costs, he would have had to invest more than the 10% of the mortgage loan not provided by the FHA, and therefore suffer a loss if he built under those conditions.

In 1966, Trump was again investigated for windfall profiteering, this time by New York's State Investigation Commission. After Trump overestimated building costs sponsored by a state program, he profited $598,000 on equipment rentals in the construction of Trump Village, which was then spent on other projects. Under testimony on January 27, 1966, Trump said that he had personally done nothing wrong and praised the success of his building project. The commission called Trump "a pretty shrewd character" with a "talent for getting every ounce of profit out of his housing project", but no indictments were made. Instead, tighter administration protocols and accountability in the state's housing program were called for.

Steeplechase Park

On July 1, 1965, Trump purchased Coney Island's recently closed Steeplechase Park for $2.3 million, intending to build luxury apartments. The next year, he announced plans for a  enclosed dome with recreational facilities and a convention center. At a highly publicized ceremony in September 1966, Trump demolished the park's Pavilion of Fun, a large glass-enclosed amusement center. He reportedly sold bricks to ceremony guests to smash the remaining glass panels, which included an iconic representation of the park's mascot, the "Funny Face". The next month, New York City announced plans to acquire the former park grounds for recreational use. Trump filed a series of court cases related to the proposed rezoning, ultimately winning $1.3 million. After the site laid vacant for several years, Trump started subleasing it to a manager of fairground amusement park rides. Over another decade, the city eventually succeeded in reclaiming the property.

Son becomes company president

Fred's son Donald joined his father's real estate business around 1968, initially working in Brooklyn, and rising to become company president in 1971. He began calling the company the Trump Organization around 1973. The younger Trump entered the real estate business in Manhattan, while his father stuck primarily to Brooklyn, Queens, and Staten Island. Donald later said: "It was good for me. You know, being the son of somebody, it could have been competition to me. This way, I got Manhattan all to myself." By most accounts, Fred himself had set the family's sights on Manhattan. According to Mary L. Trump, Fred was "intimately involved in all aspects of Donald's early forays into the Manhattan market," and Louise Sunshine (vice president of the Trump Organization from 1973 to 1985) states that Fred was "behind [Donald] in every way, shape and form [including] financing of these developments".

In the mid-1970s, Donald received loans from his father exceeding $14 million. In 2015–16, during his campaign for U.S. president, Donald claimed that his father had given him "a small loan of a million dollars" which he used to build "a company that's worth more than $10 billion". An October 2018 New York Times exposé on Fred and Donald Trump's finances concludes that Donald "was a millionaire by age 8", and that he had received $413 million (adjusted for inflation; $483.6 million in 2023 currency) from Fred's business empire over his lifetime, including over $60.7 million (unadjusted for inflation; $163.9 million in 2023 currency) in loans, which were largely unreimbursed.

Federal civil rights lawsuit
Minority applicants turned away from renting apartments complained to the New York City Commission on Human Rights and the Urban League, leading these groups to send test applicants to Trump-owned complexes in July 1972. They found that white people were offered apartments, while black people were generally turned away (by being told there were no vacancies); according to the superintendent of Beach Haven Apartments, this was at the direction of his boss. Both of the aforementioned advocacy organizations then raised the issue with the Justice Department. In October 1973, the Civil Rights Division of the U.S. Department of Justice (DoJ) filed a civil rights lawsuit against the Trump Organization (Fred Trump, chair, and Donald Trump, president) for infringing the Fair Housing Act of 1968. In response, Trump attorney Roy Cohn countersued for $100 million in damages, accusing the DoJ of false accusations.

Some three dozen former Trump employees were interviewed by the Federal Bureau of Investigation (FBI). Some testified that they had no knowledge of any racial profiling practices, and that a small percentage of their apartments were rented to blacks or Puerto Ricans. A former doorman testified that his supervisor had instructed him to tell prospective black tenants that the rent was double its actual amount. Four landlords or rental agents confirmed that applications sent to the Trump organization's head office for approval were coded by the race of the applicant. One former employee testified that a codewhich he believed was used throughout the Brooklyn branch of the companyreferred to "low lifes" such as "blacks, Puerto Ricans, apparent drug users, or any other type of undesirable applicant", and nine times out of ten it meant the applicant was black; blacks were also falsely told there were no vacancies. A rental agent who had worked with the company for two weeks said that when he asked Fred Trump if he should rent to blacks, he was told that it was "absolutely against the law to discriminate", but after asking again, he was instructed "not to rent to blacks", and was further advised to:

A consent decree between the DoJ and the Trump Organization was signed on June 10, 1975, with both sides claiming victorythe Trump Organization because the settlement did not require them "to accept persons on welfare as tenants", and the head of DoJ's housing division for the decree being "one of the most far-reaching ever negotiated". It personally and corporately prohibited the Trumps from "discriminating against any person in the ... sale or rental of a dwelling", and "required Trump to advertise vacancies in minority papers [for two years], promote minorities to professional jobs, and list vacancies on a preferential basis". Finally, it ordered the Trumps to "thoroughly acquaint themselves personally on a detailed basis with ... the Fair Housing Act of 1968".

Later legal trespasses
In early 1976, Trump was ordered by a county judge to correct code violations in a 504-unit property in Seat Pleasant, Maryland. According to the county's housing department investigator, violations included broken windows, dilapidated gutters, and missing fire extinguishers. After a court date and a series of phone calls with Trump, he was invited to the property to meet with county officials in September 1976 and arrested on site. Trump was released on $1,000 bail.

In 1987, when Donald's loan debt to his father exceeded $11 million, Fred invested $15.5 million in Trump Palace Condominiums; in 1991, he sold these shares to his son for $10,000, thus appearing to evade millions of dollars in gift taxes by masking a hidden donation, and also benefiting from a legally questionable write-off. In late 1990, when an $18.4 million bond payment for Trump's Castle was due, Fred used a bookkeeper to purchase $3.5 million in casino chips, placing no bet, helping Donald avoid defaulting on his bonds; this action, illegal in New Jersey, resulted in a $65,000 fine.

Philanthropy

Fred and Mary Trump supported medical charities by donating buildings. After Mary received medical care at the Jamaica Hospital Medical Center, they donated the Trump Pavilion; Fred was also a trustee of the hospital. The couple donated a two-building complex in Brooklyn as a home for "functionally retarded adults", a $4.75 million building in New Jersey to United Cerebral Palsy (which Donald took credit for), and other buildings to the National Kidney Foundation of New York and New Jersey. Fred reportedly also supported the Long Island Jewish Hospital and the Hospital for Special Surgery in Manhattan.

The Trumps were active in The Salvation Army, the Boy Scouts of America, and the Lighthouse for the Blind. Fred supported the private Kew-Forest School, where his children attended and he served on the board of directors. Trump backed both Jewish and Israeli causes, including Israel Bonds, donating the land for the Beach Haven Jewish Center in Flatbush, New York, and serving as the treasurer of an Israel benefit concert featuring American easy-listening performers.

Trump also made contributions to Democratic politicians in New York, giving $2,500 to the re-election campaign of Mayor Robert F. Wagner Jr. in 1961 (enabling the construction of Trump Village); together with Donald in the 1980s, Fred provided over $350,000 to New York politicians including Mayor Ed Koch.

In 2018, The New York Times reported in an exposé on Trump's financial records that they had found no evidence that he had made any significant financial contributions to charities.

Wealth and death
In 1976, Trump set up trust funds of $1 million ($5.3 million in 2023 currency) for each of his five children and three grandchildren, which paid out yearly dividends. Trump appeared on the initial Forbes 400 list of richest Americans in 1982 with an estimated $200 million fortune split with his son Donald.

In December 1990, Donald sought to amend his father's will, which according to Maryanne Trump Barry, "was basically taking the whole estate and giving it to Donald", allowing him to "sell, do anything he wants ... with the properties". The Washington Post wrote that this "was designed to protect Donald Trump's inheritance from efforts to seize it by creditors and Ivana", whom he divorced that month. Fred Trump rejected the proposal, and in 1991, composed his own final will, which made Donald, Maryanne, and Robert Trump co-executors of his estate. Trump's lawyer noted that Fred Jr.'s children, Fred III and Mary L. Trump, would be treated unequally because they would not receive their deceased father's share, and wrote to Trump that "Given the size of your estate, this is tantamount to disinheriting them. You may wish to increase their participation in your estate to avoid ill will in the future." In October 1991, Trump was diagnosed with "mild senile dementia", displaying symptoms such as forgetfulness.

Trump began to suffer from Alzheimer's disease around 1993, by which time the anticipated shares of Trump's estate amounted to $35 million for each surviving child. In November 1997, Trump transferred ownership of most of his apartment buildings, valued at just $41.4 million, to his four surviving children. Trump finally fell ill with pneumonia in mid-1999. He was admitted to Long Island Jewish Medical Center in New Hyde Park, where he died at age 93 on June 25. His funeral was held at the Marble Collegiate Church, and was attended by over 600 people. His body is buried in a family plot at the Lutheran All Faiths Cemetery in Middle Village, Queens. Upon his death, Trump's estate was estimated by his family at $250 million to $300 million, though he had only $1.9 million in cash. His will divided over $20 million after taxes among his surviving children and grandchildren. His widow, Mary, died on August 7, 2000, in New Hyde Park, New York, at age 88. Her and Fred's combined estate was then valued at $51.8 million.

Following Trump's death, Fred Jr.'s children contested their grandfather's will, citing his dementia and claiming that the will was "procured by fraud and undue influence" by Donald, Maryanne, and Robert Trump. These three had claimed in their legal depositions that Fred Trump was "sharp as a tack" until just before his death, with Donald specifically denying any knowledge of his father's mental decline, including his 1991 dementia diagnosis. Barry later privately admitted that she knew her father had dementia at the time. Mary L. Trump recounts that in later years her grandfather forgot people he had known for decades, including her, whom he referred to as "nice lady".

In May 2004, Trump's four surviving children sold the apartments they acquired in 1997 (then valued at $41.4 million) for $737.9 million ($705.6 million of which was to Rubin Schron), more than 16 times their previously declared worth. Hundreds of millions in gift taxes were effectively dodged by undervaluing the assets. In October 2018, The New York Times published an exposé which shows that Fred and Mary provided their children with over $1 billion altogether, which should have been taxed at the rate of 55% for gifts and inheritances (over $550 million), but records show that a total of only $52.2 million (about 5%) was paid. New York State could prosecute individuals on the basis of intentional tax evasion if a fraudulent return form can be produced as evidence; the statute of limitations does not apply in such cases.

Personal life

Trump met his future wife Mary Anne MacLeod, an immigrant from Tong, Lewis, Scotland, at a dance party in the early to mid-1930s. Trump told his mother the same evening that he had met his future wife. Trump, a Lutheran, married Mary, a Presbyterian, on January 11, 1936, at the Madison Avenue Presbyterian Church with George Arthur Buttrick officiating. A wedding reception was held at the Carlyle Hotel in Manhattan, and they had a single-night honeymoon in Atlantic City. The couple settled in Jamaica, Queens, and had five children: Maryanne Trump Barry (born 1937; a federal judge until her retirement), Fred Trump Jr. (1938–1981; an airline pilot with Trans World Airlines), Elizabeth Trump Grau (born 1942; a retired executive of Chase Manhattan Bank), Donald Trump (born 1946; the 45th president of the United States), and Robert Trump (1948–2020; a top executive of his father's property management company until his retirement).

Trump was a teetotaler and an authoritarian parent, maintaining curfews and forbidding cursing, lipstick, and snacking between meals. At the end of his day, Trump would receive a report from Mary on the children's actions and, if necessary, decide upon disciplinary actions. He took his children to building sites to collect empty bottles to return for the deposits. The boys had paper routes, and when weather conditions were poor, their father would let them make their deliveries in a limousine. According to Fred Jr.'s daughter, Mary L. Trump, Trump wanted his oldest son to be "invulnerable" in personality so he could take over the family business, but Fred Jr. was the opposite. Trump instead elevated Donald to become his business heir, teaching him to "be a killer", and telling him, "You are a king." Mary L. Trump states that Fred Sr. "dismantled [Fred Jr.] by devaluing and degrading every aspect of his personality" and mocked him for his decision to become an airline pilot. In 1981, Fred Jr. died at age 42 from complications due to his alcoholism.

After Elizabeth's birth, and with the U.S. becoming more involved in World War II, Trump moved his family to Virginia Beach, Virginia. In 1944, as Trump's FHA funding lulled, they returned to Jamaica Estates, Queens, where Mary suffered a miscarriage. By 1946, they were living in a five-bedroom Tudor-style house Trump built in Jamaica Estates, and Trump purchased a neighboring half-acre lot, where he built a 23-room, 9-bathroom home. The family moved in during 1950–1951, and Fred and Mary remained there until their deaths. The couple was also given an apartment on the 63rd (in reality the 55th) floor of their son Donald's Trump Tower, which they rarely used.

Despite wearing a toothbrush moustache (which was made unfashionable by Nazi dictator Adolf Hitler) until at least the late 1940s, from World War II until the 1980s Trump denied that he spoke German, and claimed he was of Swedish origin. In a 1973 interview with The New York Times, he claimed to have been born in New Jersey. These false claims of his heritage were repeated in the 1980s by Donald Trump and the author of Donald's first biography. After Fred Trump's death, his nephew and family historian John Walter explained that "He had a lot of Jewish tenants and it wasn't a good thing to be German in those days." Trump's contributions to Jewish charities led some to believe that he belonged to the Jewish faith. During the 1980s, Trump became friends with future prime minister of Israel Benjamin Netanyahu, who at the time was the Israeli ambassador to the United Nations.

Physical appearance

Trump had blue eyes. As a child, he had blond hair, which later darkened. As an adult, he stood about six feet tall. After Trump's death, journalist Philip Weiss wrote that Trump was a "vigorous and imposing man with a square chest and prominent cheekbones" and that it was said that "Fred would rise just a little on his toes" to look taller when taking pictures with Donald. Dwight Garner says of Trump as photographed by Fred W. McDarrah: "With ... his acutely white teeth and his tuxedo, Fred Trump resembles a cut-rate magician who's wandered into the Sherry-Netherland." Late in life, he wore a wig and dyed his hair, sometimes turning it red or magenta, most noticeably his eyebrows and mustache. Photographs of the elderly Fred show a depression in the side of his facepossibly betraying damage to his lower jaw.

According to Nylon.com, the 2018 New York Times exposé on the Trumps' wealth "led people to know, perhaps for the first time, what Fred Trump looks like—and it turns out he bears resemblance to no shortage of fictional villains, which has inspired a wave of new memes to bless the internet".

Legacy

Singer Woody Guthrie was a tenant of Beach Haven Apartments from 1950 to 1951. In his unrecorded song "Old Man Trump", he complained about the rent and accused Trump of stirring up racial hate "in the bloodpot of human hearts", singing:

Trump was indirectly claimed as a relative of Republican politician Fred J. Trump, a candidate in the 1956 Arizona gubernatorial election and correspondent of Richard Nixon during his 1960 presidential campaign against John F. Kennedy.

In 1985, Trump received the Horatio Alger Award (for "distinguished Americans"), named for the 19th-century author of hundreds of rags-to-riches novels. Radio and television personality Art Linkletter introduced Trump at the ceremony. The award was presented by previous recipient Ruth Peale, the wife of Norman Vincent Peale (author of the 1952 book The Power of Positive Thinking). During his speech, Trump stated that the key to his success was enthusiasm for his work and that he "used to watch other successful people ... that did good and that did bad and ... followed the good qualities that they had". He then attributed to Shakespeare the saying "Never follow an empty wagon [pointing to his cranium] because nothing ever falls off." He went on to introduce his surviving nuclear family.

Jerome Tuccille's 1985 biography of Donald Trump repeats Fred's fabrication that he was born in New Jersey and erroneously states that his middle name was Charles (not Christ). Donald's The Art of the Deal (1987) also alleges that Fred was born in New Jersey and further that he was the son of an immigrant from Sweden (not Germany). As U.S. president, Donald Trump stated at least three times that his father was born in Germany. According to the 2021 book I Alone Can Fix It, by two Washington Post journalists, during his last year as president Donald once spoke disparagingly of the German Chancellor, stating, "I know the fucking krauts," and pointing to his father's portrait, continued, "I was raised by the biggest kraut of them all." Kraut is an ethnic slur for a German (particularly a soldier of either world war).

In 1993, Harry Hurt III wrote in his book Lost Tycoon: The Many Lives of Donald J. Trump that he overheard Fred Trump talking about Donald and his wife Marla Maples as they departed for a flight, saying, "I hope their plane crashes", because then "all my problems will be solved".

During Donald Trump's 2016 presidential campaign, his father's 1927 arrest at a KKK march resurfaced. In May 2016, in an article about Donald Trump's pseudonyms, Fortune reported that his father had used the false name "Mr. Green" to anonymously inquire about property values. On October 7, 2016, in response to numerous Freedom of Information Act requests, the FBI released a small file it had on Fred Trump. It includes a 1986 New York Daily News article on Trump Management's political donations; the bureau was also possibly concerned about ties to organized crime, but much of the relevant information is redacted. On October 11, 2016, Nell Scovell detailed her attempt to visit Trump's "unassuming gray stone marker" as pictured online. Despite the cemetery's website listing the grave as one it would show "upon request", Scovell was inexorably jawboned and told flatly to "Come back after the election," leading her to quip: "Were [Donald Trump's] tax returns etched on the back of the tombstone?"

By February 2017, the FBI declassified 389 pages from its early 1970s investigation of alleged racial discrimination by Trump's company. In 2018, in response to the New York Times exposé on the Trumps, which revealed that Fred created 295 income streams for Donald, Jonathan Chait wrote for New York magazine that many of these were "illegal on their face", further arguing that "The English language has terms for people who make large sources of money from illegal activity: criminals."

In October 2019, American journalist and conspiracy theorist Wayne Madsen accused Fred Trump of being a Nazi sympathizer, citing the presence of the German American Bund in New York and asserting that Trump's Navy buildings were compromised by Nazi informants. In mid-2020, an online fact checker concluded that despite Nazi spies living in Trump's area, there was no evidence he was one.

Mary L. Trump, in her 2020 book, Too Much and Never Enough, recounts "the appalling way Donald, Fred Trump's favorite son, dismissed and derided him when he began to succumb to Alzheimer's". In the book, Mary, a clinical psychologist, diagnoses Fred as a high-functioning sociopath. Mary has also asserted that Fred could have been a Ku Klux Klan sympathizer and claimed he was "quite anti-Semitic".

In popular culture 
In the 2011 Comedy Central Roast of Donald Trump, comedian Seth MacFarlane credited Donald's fortune to his father, mocking the former's "self-starter bullshit" and comparing their relationship to that of Jaden and Will Smith.

A 2018 satirical piece in McSweeney's depicts someone who attempts to go back in time to kill Hitler as a baby, but arrives at the hospital room where Fred and Mary Trump are with the newborn Donald. Also in 2018, Fred Willard played Trump's ghost on Jimmy Kimmel Live!; an animated Fred Trump appears in episodes of Our Cartoon President (2018–2020). A racist character apparently based on Trump appears in an episode of the 2019 HBO television series Watchmen.

The 2022 film Armageddon Time depicts Trump (played by John Diehl) as a financier of a fictional college-preparatory school, based on director James Gray's recollection of being chastised by Trump while a student at Kew-Forest School.

Notes

References

Sources

See also 

 Conspiracy theories about Adolf Hitler's death

External links 

 

 

1905 births
1999 deaths
20th-century American businesspeople
American billionaires
American carpenters
American construction businesspeople
American landlords
American Lutherans
American people of German descent
American real estate businesspeople
Anti-black racism in the United States
Burials in New York (state)
Businesspeople from New York City
Deaths from Alzheimer's disease
Deaths from dementia in New York (state)
Deaths from pneumonia in New York (state)
Fathers of presidents of the United States
People from Jamaica Estates, Queens
People from the Bronx
People from Woodhaven, Queens
Philanthropists from New York (state)
Pratt Institute alumni
Fred